Nuclear strike may refer to:
 Nuclear warfare, a military conflict or political strategy in which nuclear weaponry is used to inflict damage on the enemy
 Nuclear Strike, an installment in the Strike series of video games
 "Nuclear Strike" (Spooks), a 2008 episode of the BBC television series Spooks